Navistar, Inc is an American holding company created in 1986 as the successor to International Harvester. Navistar operates as the owner of International-branded  trucks and diesel engines. The company also produces buses under the IC Bus brand. On July 1, 2021, Navistar became a wholly owned subsidiary of Traton. Navistar Defense LLC operates independently and is owned by Cerberus Capital Management. 
Headquartered in Lisle, Illinois, the company has 13,000 employees worldwide as of 2019. Navistar operates through a network of nearly 1,000 dealer outlets in the United States, Canada, Brazil, and Mexico and more than 60 dealers in 90 countries.

History

1902–1985: International Harvester

   The merger of McCormick Harvesting Machine Company and the Deering Harvester Company in 1902 resulted in the formation of the International Harvester Company (IH) of Chicago, Illinois.  In 1908, International introduced the International Harvester Auto Wagon, a forerunner of the pickup truck. Over the next three-quarters of the 20th century, the company evolved to become a diversified vehicle manufacturer across many industries.  In addition to agriculture and construction, International offered a range of trucks from consumer-grade pickup trucks (Light Line) to heavy-duty commercial trucks along with the first sport-utility vehicles (the Travelall truck-based wagon and the offroad-oriented Scout).  Alongside its Farmall tractor brand, International introduced the Cub Cadet brand of lawn and garden tractors and power equipment for home use.

1985–1991: Transition from agricultural roots

In the early to mid 1980s, International Harvester fell on hard times during the poor agricultural economy of the times; the company had never recovered from a 172-day strike during 1979–1980.  In an effort for International to survive, new CEO Donald Lennox directed company management to begin divesting many of its historical business divisions.  While some divisions were sold to stave off losses, other profitable divisions were also sold to generate much-needed revenue.  The Construction Equipment Division was sold to Dresser Industries; Solar (gas turbines) Division to Caterpillar; Cub Cadet was sold (lawn and garden equipment) to MTD Products.    In 1983, the company entered into a supply agreement with Ford Motor Company, with the Engine Division supplying the 6.9L IDI diesel V8 for Ford full-size pickup trucks and vans; at the time, V8 diesels served as a fuel-efficient alternative to large-displacement gasoline V8 engines.  With the 6.9L and its successor V8 engines, the supply agreement lasted through 2010.    At the beginning of 1985, the Agricultural Division was acquired by Tenneco, the parent company of company rival Case Corporation; the IHC name and its logo were assets of the Agricultural Division, consequently part of the sale.  Tenneco created the merged Case IH (as both brands currently remain).  Following the sale to Tenneco, all that remained of the company were the International Truck and Engine Divisions.    In response to the sale of its own brand and logo, International Harvester reintroduced itself on February 20, 1986, as Navistar International Corporation (combining "Navi-" of Navigation and "Star" from multiple truck lines).  Navistar International became the parent company of International Truck and Engine Corporation (the previous Truck and Engine Division), with an orange-red diamond logo replacing the IH "tractor" logo.  In 1987, International introduced the 8300, marking a second generation of the IHC S-Series.  Designated as the "Thousand Series" by the marketplace, the 8300 was joined by additional Class 7/8 tractors and by the 4000-series medium-duty trucks in 1989.  To upgrade fuel economy, the Thousand-Series trucks received an aerodynamic hood with faired in headlamps and turn signals; a body-color grille replaced chrome trim.

1990s

In 1990, International introduced the 9400, an aerodynamic Class 8 truck derived from the Transtar/Paystar cab, using a set-back front axle (to allow for a longer, sloped hood); the classic-style 9300 (the previous Transtar) continued.    In 1991, the final remnant of International in the automotive segment was sold off, as the Scout and Light Truck parts business was sold to Scout/Light Line Distributors, Inc.  The same year, Navistar became the parent company of a school bus manufacturer as it purchased one-third of American Transportation Corporation (AmTran).  Serving as a chassis supplier since the 1920s, Navistar gained significant market share in school bus production, acquiring AmTran entirely in April 1995.    In 1994, the IDI diesel was replaced by the all-new T444E diesel V8. Sharing only displacement with its predecessor, the T444E introduced direct injection and standard turbocharging; the engine marked the introduction of the PowerStroke diesel branding for Ford vehicles.  In 1998, following a decline in demand for COE trucks in North America, the 9800 was discontinued and production moved to Brazil.

2000s
 
After nearly a century of business in Chicago, Navistar announced its plans on 30 September 2000 to leave the city and relocate its corporate offices to west suburban Warrenville, Illinois.     In 2000, the 5000/9000-series trucks (Paystar/Transtar) received their first redesign of the cab since 1971, becoming the 5000i/9000i; the cab was enlarged (adding larger windows, moving the firewall forward).    In 2001, International introduced the "NGV" trucks (Next Generation Vehicles); the first model family developed under the founding of Navistar, NGV was intended as the successor of the Thousand-Series trucks (though using a nearly identical nomenclature).  The S-Series lasted in production through 2003 for severe-service trucks and 2004 as a cowled bus chassis.    In 2002, AmTran was rebranded as IC (Integrated Coach) after a few months as International Truck and Bus.  For 2004, Navistar reentered the consumer vehicle market for the first time since 1980, introducing the International XT (Extreme Truck) model family.  Three pickup trucks were sold, including the CXT 4x4 (derived from the 7300), the RXT 4x2 (derived from the 4300) and the MXT 4x4 (a MXT-MV redeveloped for street-legal use).  The CXT and RXT are (by far) the largest vehicles ever sold for consumer sale; to date, the former is the tallest ever mass-produced and the latter is the longest pickup truck ever mass-produced.    Following the 2006 introduction of the International ProStar long-haul tractor (replacing the aerodynamic 9400i), International began to retire its previous "Thousand-Series" nomenclature for NGV-based trucks.  In 2008, the medium-duty 4000 became the DuraStar with the 7000 severe-service trucks becoming the WorkStar.  The 8000 regional-haul tractors revived the TranStar name; the LoneStar flagship long-haul tractor had no predecessor.  Using the previous-generation i-series cab, the Paystar 5000 and the 9000i (pared down to the 9900i)         In response to low market demand, International ended sales of all three XT pickup truck lines after the 2008 model year.

Purchase of Workhorse 

In 2005, Navistar purchased the Workhorse Custom Chassis, LLC (started in 1998 by investors who took over production and sales of General Motors' popular P-series Stepvan chassis when GM dropped it), a manufacturer of step-van and motor home chassis, to seemingly re-enter the delivery van market. It appeared that the new subsidiary might also benefit by its association with a company whose history from the 1930s into the '60s included the popular Metro van. For a short time Workhorse offered an integrated chassis-body product called MetroStar. In Sept. of 2012, Navistar announced the shut down of Workhorse and the closure of the plant in Union City, Indiana, in order to cut costs. In March 2013, AMP Electric Vehicles took over Workhorse Custom Chassis, LLC's assets and began offering a range of electric vehicles. In 2015, AMP changed the company name to Workhorse Group Incorporated.

2010s

Move to Lisle, Illinois

In September 2010, despite uncertainty over EGR and a sluggish economy, Navistar leadership revived an effort to relocate the company headquarters from Warrenville, IL, to nearby Lisle, IL.  The new headquarters was expected to retain or create 3,000 permanent jobs and about 400 construction jobs. Navistar President Dan Ustian said roughly 500 engineers would be hired immediately.  Navistar aimed to invest $110 million in the 1.2 million-square-foot Lisle campus, which would include product development. The state gave Navistar incentives of nearly $65 million, including tax credits. In March 2011, Navistar announced the move to Lisle.  Renovations were completed in the fall, but the company gradually moved from Warrenville to Lisle in summer 2011.  "You can't build a campus like this anywhere for anywhere near the price we paid for this, and even though you might get more incentives, when you look at the whole picture, you really can't beat it," said Don Sharp, Navistar vice president.

In 2011, Navistar began phasing out its Truck Development and Technology Center (TDTC) in Fort Wayne, Indiana.  In early December 2011, the company laid off 130 employees, mostly engineers and designers who were United Auto Workers members.  In total, 300 out of 1,400 Fort Wayne employees eventually accepted offers to relocate to Illinois.  The other 1,100 workers either retired or chose to remain in Indiana and find work elsewhere.  The cost to move employees and consolidate operations was estimated to be $75 million.  The only Navistar employees remaining after December 2012 were 20-25 people manning the company's test track on Oxford Street.  In late July 2015, the TDTC closed and the remaining workers were let go.

Tension mounts

In June 2012, speculation mounted about a possible takeover of the struggling truck maker.  This came as hedge fund MHR Fund Management LLC disclosed a 13.6% stake in the company, slightly higher than billionaire activist investor Carl Icahn's 11.9% stake.   As a result, Navistar adopted a poison pill defense.  If the plan were triggered by an outside investor taking a stake of 15 percent or more in the company, then Navistar would issue its shareholders rights that would let them buy new common stock in the company at a discount of 50 percent: For each share held, the investor could buy $280 worth of new shares for $140.  The investor who took the 15 percent stake or more would not have the right to buy additional shares. In August 2012, Navistar announced it would use Cummins engines and SCR technology.  After 37 years with the company, Dan Ustian retired immediately in August 2012 and left his position on the board as well.  Former Textron CEO Lewis Campbell was named interim CEO and Troy Clarke was promoted to chief operating officer.  Ustian's severance package began at $7.9 million.  The company's proxy statement during this time estimated the total package to be $14.6 million, contingent on a share price of $42.07 on Oct. 31, 2011, the end of the company's fiscal year. On September 9, 2012, billionaire and key stock holder Carl Icahn sent an open letter to Navistar's board, blasting them for "abysmal business decisions" and "poor corporate governance."  Icahn noted from 2009 to 2012, that "this Board has authorized spending shareholder money on lawsuits against suppliers, competitors and regulators, marketing plans to convince customers that non-compliant engines are actually compliant, accumulating non-core assets such as a Recreational Vehicle manufacturer, and a "gold-plated" corporate headquarters that cost over $100 million. The one thing this Board refused to spend money on was a back-up plan involving the industry standard technology Navistar now must rely on." In a September 2012 interview, Cummins CEO Tom Linebarger said, "all we did was act nice to them (Navistar) even when they didn't talk nicely about us," he smiled, recalling harsh comments that Navistar executives had made about SCR being used by all its competitors. In October 2012, Chief Product Officer Deepak Kapur stepped down, followed by Group Vice President of Product Development Ramin Younessi in December 2012.  CIO Don Sharp also left the company in April 2013.

Layoffs and consolidation

August 2012 featured a Voluntary Separation Program (VSP) as well as involuntary layoffs.  This was due to the failed engine strategy, rising warranty costs and declines in commercial and military sales.  The company let go 500 employees and in September 2012, announced plans to lay off 200 more salaried employees. In addition, the company announced it would close its Garland, Texas manufacturing facility by mid-2013, resulting in the loss of 900 jobs. In March 2013, Navistar announced that interim CEO Lewis Campbell would step down and COO Troy Clarke would be named CEO and chairman of the board.  Jack Allen was named COO.  In June 2013, CFO A.J. Cederoth stepped down and James M. Moran, Navistar senior vice president, and treasurer, would act as interim CFO until a successor could be found.  In late June 2013, former General Motors executive Walter Borst was named Executive VP and CFO. In September 2013, Navistar announced it would cut 500 more jobs amid a larger than expected third-quarter loss.  Navistar reported a slower than expected return to profitability due to large market share losses, declining sales, and weak market conditions. In May 2014, a third round of lay-offs in as many years occurred at the corporate headquarters as part of ongoing cost-cutting measures. On July 31, 2015, Navistar ceased operations and laid off the remaining 15 employees at the Truck Development and Technology Center (TDTC) in Fort Wayne, Indiana. In November 2015 and December 2015, several hundred Navistar employees voluntarily left the Corporate HQ office in Lisle, IL, as part of another Voluntary Separation Package (VSP).

Cost-cutting and divestitures

As part of the turnaround plan, Navistar executives cut costs aggressively.  They cut SG&A costs by 16% in 2013 and cut product development spending by 24%.  Interim CEO Lewis Campbell's priorities included a focus on quality, reducing the company's cost structure and paring back its product line. Navistar also sold several businesses that it deemed were not providing enough of a Return On Invested Capital (ROIC).  Among them were their Monaco Coach Corporation Recreational Vehicle (RV) business as well as Workhorse Chassis.  They also exited their joint venture with Mahindra  and sold off their E-Z Pack unit, which made bodies for garbage trucks, as well as its Continental Mixer unit, which made concrete mixers, for prices the company characterized as "not material." In January 2014, Forbes reported several key challenges facing Navistar, which include declining military sales, a pension plan underfunded by $2.7 billion, two self-disclosed weaknesses in accounting practices and a new collective bargaining agreement for the company's 6,000 full and part-time workers who are represented by labor unions. In February 2014, Navistar announced it would move some engine production operations from Huntsville, Alabama, to Melrose Park, Illinois by summer 2014.  The move eliminated 280 jobs in Alabama and saved an estimated $22 million.  Navistar said it would keep two other diesel engine plants operating in Huntsville. In September 2014, Navistar reported its best quarter in years.  It announced a third-quarter net loss of $2 million, or $0.02 per diluted share, compared to a third-quarter 2013 net loss of $247 million, or $3.06 per diluted share. It was also in September that CEO Troy Clarke announced that the company's biggest divestitures were complete, and that the focus would now be on regaining lost market share. On November 6, 2014, leadership changes continued at Navistar, with Executive VP and COO Jack Allen retiring immediately.  Rather than hire a new COO, CEO Troy Clarke split the COO duties among three other executives.

GM and Navistar reach commercial vehicle agreement 
  General Motors Co. and Navistar have reached a long-term agreement to develop and assemble future medium-duty, conventional cab Class 4/5 commercial vehicles, allowing Navistar to strengthen its product lineup and GM to expand its Chevrolet commercial truck portfolio. The future trucks will be jointly developed using Navistar's expertise in rolling chassis configurations and manufacturing capabilities, and GM's commercial components and engines. The vehicles entered production in late 2018 and are manufactured at Navistar's facility in Springfield, Ohio.

Strategic partnership with Traton SE

In September 2016, Navistar and Volkswagen Truck and Bus (now called Traton), the subsidiary of the Volkswagen Group that controls European heavy truck makers MAN and Scania, announced their intent to pursue a strategic technology collaboration and to establish a procurement joint venture. Volkswagen Truck & Bus would take a 16.6% stake in Navistar, in return for an investment of $256 million. Navistar expects to realize cumulative synergies of $500 million over the first five years. In March 2017 it was announced that Volkswagen Truck & Bus's 16.6% equity investment in Navistar became effective from February 28, 2017, with Volkswagen Truck & Bus executives Andreas Renschler and Matthias Gründler joining the Navistar Board of Directors.

2020s

Navistar becomes part of Traton 

On January 30, 2020, Traton announced a proposal to purchase all outstanding shares in Navistar. In April 2021, Navistar International Corp. and Traton SE's pending merger transaction began its review process with Brazil's Administrative Council for Economic Defense, or CADE, with market surveys being distributed to 35 companies.  On July 1, 2021, Traton successfully completed its takeover of all shares in Navistar, and therefore Navistar became part of the Traton Group. As part of the acquisition, the company was renamed Navistar, Inc from Navistar International Corporation.

Navistar partnered TuSimple to develop robot truck

On July 15, 2020, Navistar established a developmental production partnership with TuSimple, an autonomous trucking technology company, to manufacture Level-4 autonomous semi-trucks. The production is said to start in 2024   Although with non-disclosure of the total investment amount from both the parties, Navistar has taken a minority stake in TuSimple.

Corporate operations

International Trucks (1986–present)

   In 1986, after the transition from International Harvester to Navistar, the truck product line (essentially all that was left) continued to use the International brand name.  The International brand encompasses a variety of medium-duty, over-the-road, and severe-service trucks.

 Medium Duty

 International CV Series (also produced as Chevrolet Silverado C6500 HD)
 International MV Series

 Heavy Duty

 International LoneStar
 International LT Series
 International RH Series

 Severe Duty

 International HX Series
 International HV Series

IC Bus (2002–present)

  International has a long history in the school bus industry as a chassis provider, dating to when school buses first became motorized.  In 1991, Navistar entered the school bus industry as a body manufacturer when it began its acquisition of AmTran, an Arkansas-based company founded as Ward Body Works in 1933.  Today, IC Bus produces several models of full-sized school buses along with buses for commercial use.

 School/activity buses

 CE-Series conventional (International 3300 chassis)
 RE-Series rear-engine transit-style (International 3000 chassis)

 Commercial buses

 CE-Series conventional (International 3300 chassis)
 RE-Series rear-engine transit-style (International 3000 chassis)
 TC-Series chassis (International 3300 chassis)

MWM International Motores (2005–present)

In 2005, Navistar purchased MWM International Motores, a Brazilian engine manufacturer formerly associated with Deutz AG.

Engines (1986–present)
  In 1986, Navistar was formed from the engine division of the former International Harvester (alongside the truck division).  In a continuation from its predecessor, International produced both gasoline and diesel-fueled engines for its medium-duty trucks and some heavy-duty trucks, offering second-party engines as an option.  Class 8 trucks offered second-party diesel engines (from Caterpillar, Cummins, and Detroit Diesel). From International Harvester, International inherited production of the SV-series gasoline V8, IDI diesel V8, DV-series diesel V8, and DT466 inline-6. After 1986, the production of gasoline engines ended, shifting to diesel-powered engines entirely. During the 1980s, Navistar began an expansion of its engine families.  For 1986, a 7.3L version of the IDI was introduced; the engine supplanted the long-running DV-series V8 by the end of 1988; the same year, it became an option in Ford trucks.  For 1987, the DT inline-6 engine family was expanded to a second engine, as the DT360 was introduced (competing directly against the Cummins 6BT). 

During 1994 production, the IDI V8 was replaced by the direct-injection T444E V8, sharing little more than its displacement with its predecessor; the T444E became the first Ford PowerStroke engine.  While the DT360 was withdrawn (largely replaced by the T444E), the DT466 (now the DT466E) was joined by the larger DT530E (competing primarily against the Cummins C8.3). For the 2000s, International began developing engines to comply with updated emissions standards for commercial vehicles.  During 2003, the T444E was discontinued and replaced the VT engine family, introduced by the VT365 V8.  For 2004, the DT engines received modernized fuel injection and a redesigned turbocharger; the DT530 was replaced by the DT570 (sized between the Caterpillar C9 and the Cummins ISL).  In place of using Selective Catalytic Reduction (SCR) to treat engine emissions, International adopted Exhaust Gas Recirculation (EGR), a configuration used with success in automobiles with gasoline engines. 

For 2007 emissions compliance, International launched the "MaxxForce" branding for its diesel engines.  The VT engine family consisted of the 4.5L MaxxForce 5 V6 and the 6.4L MaxxForce 7 V8 (replacing the VT365).  The DT466 became the MaxxForceDT, with the DT and HT570 becoming the MaxxForce 9 and 10, respectively.  For its Class 8 trucks, the company introduced "large-bore" engines for the first time, introducing the 10.5L MaxxForce 11 and the 12.4L MaxxForce 13. After the 2010 model year, Ford ended its engine supply agreement with International, continuing the PowerStroke range under its own designs.  The MaxxForce 7 and DT engines were updated with twin turbochargers to improve emissions compliance. 

Following several years of difficulty reliably matching 2007 and 2010 emissions compliance, International chose to end diesel engine production following the 2015 model year, replacing the MaxxForce 7 and MaxxForceDT with the Cummins ISB6.7 and ISL9, respectively. 

In 2017, International reentered the diesel engine production segment, launching the A26 12.4L inline-6.  Largely serving as a company-produced successor to the MaxxForce 13, the A26 was developed from the MAN D26 engine. 

In 2022, Navistar introduced the International S13 engine. Unlike the A26, the S13 engine operates on low revolutions and higher torque equating to fewer fuel injections and less fuel consumption. This engine uses selective catalytic reduction (SCR) technology, something that has never been used in Navistar's older engines.

Plug-in electric vehicles

Plug-in hybrid electric bus

The U.S. Department of Energy announced in 2009 the selection of Navistar Corporation for a cost-shared award of up to  million to develop, test, and deploy plug-in hybrid electric vehicle (PHEV) school buses. The project aims to deploy 60 vehicles for a three-year period in school bus fleets across the nation. The vehicles will be capable of running in either electric-only or hybrid modes that can be recharged from standard electrical outlets. Because electricity will be their primary fuel, they will consume less petroleum than standard vehicles. To develop the PHEV school bus, Navistar will examine a range of hybrid architectures and evaluate advanced energy storage devices, with the goal of developing a vehicle with a  range. Travel beyond the range will be facilitated by a clean diesel engine capable of running on renewable fuels. The DOE funding will cover up to half of the project's cost and will be provided over three years, subject to annual appropriations.

eStar electric van

The eStar was an all-electric van. Production began in March 2010 and first deliveries began two months later via its Workhorse Group division. The technology used in eStar was licensed to Navistar in 2009 in a joint venture with Modec and Navistar bought the intellectual property rights from the Modec's bankruptcy administrators in 2011. The introduction of the eStar was supported by a  million U.S. Department of Energy stimulus grant under the 2009 American Recovery and Reinvestment Act. The eStar had a  payload capacity available with a 14- or 16-foot cargo box. The vehicle was powered by a 70 kW 102 hp electric motor powered by an 80kWhr lithium-ion battery pack supplied by A123 Systems, and also used regenerative braking. By May 2010 the eStar had received U.S. Environmental Protection Agency (EPA) and CARB certifications. The eStar also met all Federal Motor Vehicle Safety Standards (FMVSS). The first vans were delivered in May 2010 to FedEx Express for use in Los Angeles. Other customers included Pacific Gas and Electric Company (PG&E), The Coca-Cola Company, and Canada Post. Navistar discontinued the eStar van in March 2013, as part of a corporate restructuring plan to focus on current profitability.

Navistar Defense LLC (2003–present)
 
In 2003, Navistar created Navistar Defense.  While Navistar had manufactured vehicles for the military long into its existence as International Harvester, Navistar Defense would operate as a freestanding division within the company.    Alongside the MaxxPro MRAP and the MXT-MV, Navistar Defense has developed military variants of the 5000 and 7000 severe-service trucks (today, the HX and HV-Series on-road).

Joint ventures

Current

General Motors

 Navistar entered into an agreement to purchase General Motors' medium duty truck unit in 2007, but because of changing market conditions the purchase ultimately did not occur, and production of the Chevrolet Kodiak and GMC TopKick were discontinued in 2009 as GM entered bankruptcy protection. In 2015, a joint venture between the two companies for development of a new Class 4/5 commercial vehicle was announced. In early 2017, Navistar's truck assembly plant in Springfield, Ohio, began production of cutaway van chassis variants of the GMT610 Chevrolet Express and GMC Savana. Further details around the Chevy Silverado 4500HD/5500HD/6500HD were announced by General Motors early in 2018, with Navistar also unveiling the International-branded variant of the truck, the CV series, shortly thereafter. Production started in late 2018. The truck serves as a successor to the previously discontinued Chevrolet Kodiak and International TerraStar, competing against the Ford Super Duty F-450/F-550/F-600 and Ram Chassis Cab.

Tatra

Tatra and Navistar Defence introduced at Eurosatory Exposition in Paris, France (June 14–18, 2010) the results of their strategic alliance since October 2009, the models ATX6 (universal container carrier) and ATX8 (troop carrier) The vehicles appear to be based on Tatra T815-7 (T817) 6x6, 8x8 chassis, suspension and cabins while using Navistar engines and other components. Under the deal Navistar Defence and Tatra A.S. will market the vehicles in North America, which includes sales to the United States military and foreign military sales financed by the United States government. Tatra will source parts and components through Navistar's global parts and support network for Tatra trucks delivered in markets outside of North America, as well as market Navistar-Tatra vehicles around the world in their primary markets.

Former

Ford Motor Company

  From the 1980s to the 2010s, Navistar had a close relationship with Ford Motor Company.  Commencing for the 1983 model year as an engine-supply agreement, the relationship evolved into a $400 million yearly business, culminating into joint production of entire vehicle lines.    Following the end of the diesel-engine supply agreement after the 2010 model year, Ford and Navistar ended collaborative production of medium-duty commercial trucks after the 2014 model year

Ford diesel V8 engine 

As a result of the gas crises of the 1970s, the implementation of Corporate Average Fuel Economy (CAFE), was applied to light trucks alongside automobiles. In response, large-block gasoline V8 engines (such as the Ford 460) were withdrawn from production from pickup trucks and full-size vans. While roughly matching the output of the discontinued 400 cubic-inch V8 (the engine that it replaced alongside a reintroduced 460), the 6.9L diesel offered fuel economy closer to the standard 4.9L inline-6. While originally developed for the S1700 medium-duty truck, the engine supply agreement brought a diesel engine to market faster (and at far lower cost) than developing an engine from the ground up. In 1988, as International phased out the 6.9L engine, Ford received the 7.3L IDI diesel. During 1994 production, the IDI was replaced by the all-new T444E; to emphasize the introduction of direct injection fuel delivery, Ford began to brand International-sourced engines under the "PowerStroke" branding. As with the IDI, the T444E/PowerStroke was used in F-Series/E-Series trucks and vans. During 2003 production, the Ford Super Duty line and the E-Series adopted the VT365, replacing the T444E. For 2008, the MaxxForce 7 was introduced for the Super Duty pickups as a PowerStroke engine; in place of a variable-geometry turbocharger (used by International trucks), Ford versions of the engine were fitted with compound turbochargers. As the 6.4L engine would not properly fit in the vehicle, the E-Series continued use of the 6.0L diesel. After the 2010 model year, Ford ended the use of International-supplied diesel engines. From 2011 onward, the Super Duty was fitted with diesel engines developed by Ford; the E-Series shifted production exclusively to gasoline-based engines. Today, Ford continues the use of the PowerStroke branding, using it for multiple diesel engines produced by the company.

Blue Diamond Truck
 
In September 2001, Navistar announced a joint venture with Ford, named Blue Diamond Truck Co. LLC.  A 50/50 agreement between the two companies, Blue Diamond was intended to develop and manufacture vehicles and powertrains for both companies using the International facility in General Escobedo, Mexico. In 2004, Blue Diamond Truck launched production.    While sharing a common frame, the Ford F-650 and F-750 Super Duty were produced with different bodywork and powertrains than the International 4200/4300.  In 2006, Blue Diamond released the Ford LCF/International CF, the first model line developed under the joint venture.  To create the low-cab COE, the frame (sourced from the Ford F-450/F-550 Super Duty) was mated with the cab of the Mazda Titan (converted to left-hand drive).  The LCF received the first engine developed by Blue Diamond Truck, a 4.5L V6 (a 6-cylinder version of the 6.0L V8).    In 2015, the Blue Diamond Truck venture was dissolved by Ford.  International retained production at General Escobedo, with Ford shifting medium-duty truck production to its facility in  Avon Lake, Ohio.

Anhui Jianghuai Navistar
On 16 September 2010, Anhui Jianghuai Automobile Co., Ltd. (JAC) announced joint ventures with NC2 Global and Navistar International Corporation that will develop, build, and market heavy duty trucks and diesel engines in China. In May 2018, it was announced that Cummins would be buying out Navistar's equity in the venture.

Mahindra Navistar

  Navistar formed a joint venture with Mahindra & Mahindra to build heavy trucks in India under the "Mahindra International" brand, which has since been renamed Mahindra Navistar. These trucks were displayed at Auto Expo 2010 in Delhi, India. The joint venture ceased as Navistar exited the joint venture in 2013.

DINA/DIMEX Navistar
   DINA (Diesel Nacional, S.A. de C.V, in English: National Diesel) or DIMEX (Diesel Mexicano, S.A. de C.V, in English: Mexican Diesel) for International Version is a Mexican bus and truck manufacturer based in Ciudad Sahagún, Hidalgo, Mexico. It was created by the federal government of Mexico in 1951 as Diesel Nacional, S.A..[1], and is currently owned by Grupo Empresarial G and its subsidiaries (since 1989). The company has gone through several stages of production of freight and bus models throughout its history, thanks to technological and commercial agreements and partnerships with various companies such as Fiat, Renault, Marcopolo S.A., Flxible, Cummins, Perkins, Chrysler, Caterpillar, Scania, MCI, Škoda, Spicer, Eaton and Dana. Today its primary production is buses for urban domestic and foreign use. They have developed their truck technology with a subsidiary of BMW. Currently, nearly 20% of the national vehicle fleet operate in Mexico, along with other Latin American countries. In 2001, to avoid bankruptcy, a group of administrative staff of Grupo Empresarial G, owners of the company remnants, carried out the financial restructuring of DINA Camiones. This process consisted of the sale of the plants that the group owned. In 2002, the government of the state of Hidalgo bought the facilities of the DINA Camiones plant. In 2005, a group of Argentine businessmen bought the Argentine DINA plant. Subsequently, problems arising due to the cancellation of the contract with Western Star Trucks, was settled by legal means. Freightliner paid a large compensation to the Mexican company. In compliance with the agreement, the amount was not disclosed. In 2004, the process of designing new passenger units began, based on HTQ technology, as well as on national and international standards. Starting in 2007, the first five prototypes of the chassis were concluded. The design and construction of a new plant began, along with the necessary equipment and tools. This was in the same industrial zone of Ciudad Sahagún, state of Hidalgo, Mexico. In July 2007, a prototype departed the new DINA plant. Its purpose was to conduct road tests, prior to production and marketing. In May 2008, the restart of DINA Camiones was announced, with the production and sales of four new bus models, all of them the urban type: DINA Linner, Runner, Picker and Outsider. At the time of restarting operations that year, the investment was US$100 million. The plant had a capacity of 23 units per day, 450 direct and 750 indirect jobs, and five concessionaires in different Mexican states to sell their units in Mexico.

Controversies
In December 2011, the nonpartisan organization Public Campaign criticized Navistar International for spending $6.31 million on lobbying and not paying any taxes during 2008–2010, instead getting $18 million in tax rebates, despite making a profit of $896 million and increasing executive pay by 81%.
On January 31, 2005, Navistar Financial said it would restate financial statements for fiscal years 2002 and 2003 and the first three quarters of fiscal 2004, because it did not take into consideration potential changes to future income.
On April 7, 2006, Navistar restated financial results from 2002 through 2004, and for the first three quarters of 2005, due to accounting practices that are the subject of a continuing review.

Accounting issues
In January 2006, the company declared it would not file its form 10-K annual report with the U.S. Securities and Exchange Commission on time. The delay was caused by the disagreement with its auditors, Deloitte & Touche, over complex accounting issues. In April, Navistar fired Deloitte, its independent auditor for 98 years, and hired KPMG to help restate earnings back to 2002 to fix accounting errors. On December 15, 2006, Navistar executives announced a further delay in its restatement and 2006 results. The announcement prompted the New York Stock Exchange (NYSE) to announce the delisting of the company, after 98 years of trading, although the NYSE subsequently delayed the delisting pending an appeal by Navistar. However, Navistar was removed from the S&P 500 Index, and the NYSE eventually denied Navistar's appeal and delisted the stock; it traded on the Pink Sheets until 30 June 2008, when it was relisted on the NYSE, under its previous ticker symbol, NAV, after catching up with its filings. Christopher Anderson, the Deloitte partner responsible for the 2003 audit, accepted a one-year suspension from public audits in 2008, and became the first individual to be fined by the Public Company Accounting Oversight Board.

CEO Daniel Ustian agreed to surrender to Navistar shares worth $1.3 million, while former Chief Financial Officer Robert C. Lannert consented to repay $1.05 million, each sum reflecting monetary bonuses they had received during the restatement period, the SEC said. Four other company executives paid civil penalties without admitting liability.

In December 2014, Navistar disclosed more accounting problems.  These involved out-of-period adjustments, which were corrections of prior period errors relating to product warranties.  This resulted in a $36 million increase in Cost of Products Sold.  In addition, a material weakness was disclosed.  In the company's annual 10K, they reported that weakness was "surrounding validation of the completeness and accuracy of underlying data used in the determination of significant accounting estimates and accounting transactions. Specifically, controls were not designed to identify errors in the underlying data which was used to calculate warranty cost estimates and other significant accounting estimates and the accounting effects of significant transactions.

Failed engine strategy
In 2001, then CEO Dan Ustian faced numerous United States Environmental Protection Agency (EPA) regulations to reduce the amount of nitrogen oxides and soot emanating from diesel engines.  Despite the change in the compliance arena, the regulations would not begin to be phased in until 2007, with full implementation slated for 2010.

Ustian had multiple engineering paths available.  Among them were Selective Catalytic Reduction (SCR), Exhaust Gas Recirculation (EGR), or the use of nitrogen oxide absorbers.  All required more engineering and development to achieve compliance.  Ustian believed truckers did not want to bother with an extra tank of fluid after treatment.  As a result, he convinced the company to spend $700 million to fund EGR development.

On October 31, 2007, Navistar formally announced their intent to move forward with EGR as the company's strategy.  The company statement included Ustian mentioning "I have publicly been an advocate of customer friendly emissions control solutions which do not add additional costs to our truck and bus customers. While SCR is a means to achieve the NOx reduction requirement for 2010, it comes with a steep cost to our customers. Our ability to achieve our goals without adding customer cost and inconvenience is a competitive advantage for International."

On November 24, 2008, Navistar revealed it would use EPA Credits in order to comply with the 2010 legislation.

In February 2009, Ustian touted the benefits of EGR technology as a key differentiator for the company's engines.  However, by now, the rest of the industry had chosen to use compliant SCR technology.  Ustian disagreed with SCR, saying "the other thing that EGR avoids is the risks of an SCR strategy.  Read the label on this and it will show you that there are challenges with keeping control of using this technology: 'Store between 23 degrees and 68 degrees.' So essentially it says you can't throw it outside.  You can't operate it in conditions above 85 [degrees] or below 12 [degrees]. You can, but, it will put the burden onto the customers."

Non-conformance penalties
The EPA recognized Navistar's imminent non-compliance and created a system of Non-Conformance Penalties (NCPs) that included a $1,919 fine for every non-compliant engine that Navistar sold.  To bridge the gap, Navistar began using EPA credits it had previously earned for being compliant in lieu of paying fines.  In August 2012, Navistar stated they would run out of EPA credits soon.  Only days earlier the EPA announced increased new penalties of $3,744 per engine.

In March 2009, Navistar sued the EPA, claiming that the agency's guidance documents for SCR implementation were invalid because they were adopted without a public process and with input only from the SCR engine makers.  Navistar and the EPA settled the lawsuit a year later.

Further masking the EGR problem were high military sales.  In the company's 2010 10K report, Navistar cited orders for MRAPs as offsetting flat commercial sales due to the recession.

In January 2012, the EPA adopted an interim final rule that allowed Navistar to continue selling the engines subject to NCPs. Several Navistar competitors sued, and in June 2012 the same appeals court ruled that EPA's interim rule was invalid because it did not give the public notice and an opportunity for comment.

In the meantime, Navistar's EGR decision had led to significant reliability issues and quality problems (which were ultimately traceable to the fundamental physical reality that recirculation of exhaust gas introduces intrinsically abrasive soot and inherently corrosive acid gases back into the engine).  Truck drivers began losing trust and confidence as Navistar vehicles were breaking down frequently.  Consequently, they abandoned Navistar trucks in favor of competitor's trucks.

Legal issues (MaxxForce engines)
In December 2014, the United States Judicial Panel on Multidistrict Litigation ordered that 13 of 14 civil lawsuits brought against Navistar for MaxxForce engines would be consolidated into one case.  The consolidated lawsuits say Navistar's use of Advanced Exhaust Gas Recirculation emission control system, or EGR, was defective and resulted in repeated engine failures and frequent repairs and downtime.

On December 16, 2014, Navistar reported a larger than expected fourth quarter net loss of $72 million.  While sales rose 9 percent to $3 billion, the company cited restructuring and warranty costs as the main reasons for the loss.  A day earlier, the company announced it would be closing its engine foundry in Indianapolis, resulting in the loss of 100 jobs and costing $11 million.  The company estimated annual savings of $13 million in operating costs.

In March 2015, Navistar reported a first-quarter 2015 net loss of $42 million, or $0.52 per diluted share, compared to a first-quarter 2014 net loss of $248 million, or $3.05 per diluted share. Revenues in the quarter were $2.4 billion, up to $213 million or 10 percent, versus the first quarter of 2014.  The higher revenues in the quarter were driven by a 17 percent year-over-year increase in charge outs for Class 6-8 trucks and buses in the United States and Canada. This included a 42 percent increase in school buses; a 25 percent increase in Class 6/7 medium trucks; a 7 percent increase in Class 8 heavy trucks; and a 5 percent increase in Class 8 severe service trucks. Higher sales in the company's export truck operations also contributed to the increase, partially offset by a decrease in used truck sales. The company finished the first quarter with a 27 percent year-over-year increase in order backlog for Class 6-8 trucks.

On June 4, 2015, Navistar reported a second-quarter net loss of $64 million, or 78 cents a share, compared with a year-earlier loss of $297 million, or $3.65 a share. Revenue fell to $2.69 billion from $2.75 billion. Analysts had expected a loss of 18 cents a share and revenue of $2.82 billion.

On June 9, 2015, Navistar named Jeff Sass as the new Senior VP of North American Truck Sales.  Sass previously worked 20 years for rival Paccar.

On June 12, 2015, Mark Rachesky's MHR Fund Management LLC disclosed a 6% increased stake in Navistar, up to 15,446,562 shares.  The firm now owns 18.9% of Navistar.

In July 2015, the EPA filed a civil lawsuit against Navistar seeking $300 million in fines over its use of non-compliant engines in its 2010-model trucks – engines that did not meet the agency's exhaust emission standards.   "Because (Navistar) completed manufacturing and assembling processes for the subject engines in 2010 … each and every engine was 'produced' in 2010 and is therefore not a model 2009 engine," the complaint said.  Navistar classified the engines as 2009 model year engines because it began assembling them in 2009.  Navistar has stated they dispute the allegations and would "aggressively defend" their position.

On July 20, 2015, Navistar announced that it was refinancing the $697.5 million senior secured term loan facility of Navistar, Inc., which matures in August 2017, with a new $1.040 billion senior secured term loan, which will mature in August 2020. The refinancing will extend the maturity of the term loan facility and provide additional liquidity and financial flexibility for the company.

In March 2016, the Securities and Exchange Commission charged Navistar with misleading investors about its development of the advanced technology truck engine.

In August 2017, a Tennessee jury found that Navistar committed fraud and violated the Tennessee Consumer Practice Act in connection with the sale of 243 Navistar International ProStars with MaxxForce engines to Milan Supply Chain Solutions. It awarded $10.8 million in actual damages and $20 million in punitive damages.  The trial included testimony from Jim Hebe, who previously was the senior vice president, North America Sales Operations.  Hebe retired in October 2012.  Hebe's testimony about the engine program mentioned that the company "did not test s**t".  In a statement, Navistar said it is disappointed in the jury's verdict and is evaluating its options to challenge it, noting it has successfully defended similar claims in several jurisdictions, including dismissal of claims of fraud in courts in Texas, Wisconsin, Michigan, Indiana, Alabama, and Illinois.

Facilities

Corporate facilities

Manufacturing facilities

Former facilities

Images

See also

 International Harvester
 List of International (brand) trucks
 List of International Harvester vehicles
 Odyne Corporation
 Traton Group
 Volkswagen Group

References

External links
 
 International Trucks
 

American companies established in 1986
 
Defense companies of the United States
Holding companies of the United States
Motor vehicle manufacturers based in Illinois
Military vehicle manufacturers
Diesel engine manufacturers
Vehicle manufacturing companies established in 1986
Holding companies established in 1986
Companies based in DuPage County, Illinois
Lisle, Illinois
Companies formerly listed on the New York Stock Exchange
American subsidiaries of foreign companies
2021 mergers and acquisitions
Manufacturing companies based in Illinois
Traton